Johnie Walstine Watson (January 5, 1896 – July 13, 1958) was an American Negro league outfielder in the 1920s.

A native of Beaumont, Texas, Watson made his Negro leagues debut in 1922 for the Detroit Stars. He went on to play four seasons with the Stars, making his final appearance in 1926. Watson died in Philadelphia, Pennsylvania in 1958 at age 62.

References

External links
 and Baseball-Reference Black Baseball stats and Seamheads

1896 births
1958 deaths
Detroit Stars players
20th-century African-American sportspeople
Baseball outfielders